Jaakson is an Estonian patronymic surname meaning "son of Jaak". Notable people with the surname include:

Aleksander Jaakson (1892–1942), Estonian military commander
Arvo Jaakson (born 1942), Estonian politician
Ernst Jaakson (1905–1998), Estonian diplomat
Jüri Jaakson (1870–1942), Estonian businessman and politician

Estonian-language surnames
Patronymic surnames